The Thésée was a  74-gun ship of the line of the French Navy. As Révolution, she took part in the Expédition d'Irlande under Pierre Dumanoir le Pelley.

External links 
 Ships of the line

Ships of the line of the French Navy
Ships built in France
Téméraire-class ships of the line
1790 ships